Twisted: The Untold Story of a Royal Vizier is a musical with music by A. J. Holmes, lyrics by Kaley McMahon, book by Matt Lang, Nick Lang, and Eric Kahn Gale, and directed by Brian Holden. It was produced by StarKid Productions. 

The musical parodies the 1992 Walt Disney Animation Studios' film Aladdin, and The Walt Disney Company in general, telling the story from the point of view of Ja'far, the Royal Vizier. It has several nods and homages to the musical Wicked, which similarly retells a popular story from the villain's point of view.

Twisted opened in Chicago's Greenhouse Theatre on July 4 2013 and closed on July 28 2013 as part of a limited run. The group put the entire musical up on YouTube on November 27, 2013. The musical's cast recording debuted at No. 63 on the American iTunes Top 100 albums chart.

Plot

Act I
Ja'far, the Royal Vizier, walks through the Magic Kingdom while conversing with the villagers, who blame him for all of their problems ("Dream a Little Harder"). The Captain of the Guard informs Ja'far that a thief named Aladdin recently terrorized the populace, leaving a lot of people dead. Aladdin has also humiliated the visiting Prince Achmed of Pixar (pronounced PEEK-zahr), whom Ja'far has brought for diplomatic reasons. Aladdin then appears, gloating that he lives by taking whatever he wants ("I Steal Everything").

Ja'far returns to the palace but is greeted by an angry Prince Achmed, upon whom the Princess has sicced her pet tiger. Insulted, Prince Achmed declares war on the Magic Kingdom. Ja'far berates the Princess for her carelessness, while she naïvely longs for a life of freedom ("Everything and More").

Ja'far finds out that the Sultan had ordered the execution of the "2D department" and wrecks his room. In the ruckus, he finds a golden necklace that reminds him of his past ("Sands of Time"). In a flashback, Ja'far is loved by the villagers and teaches them to follow "The Golden Rule". On his first day on the job as Assistant Royal Vizier, Ja'far discovers that the Royal Vizier and his court are corrupt and only care about money ("The Golden Rule (Evil Reprise)"). His mood is lifted when palace storyteller Scheherazade tells him the story of the Tiger Head Cave, which contains an oil lamp housing a wish-granting Djinn. Ja'far and Scheherazade fall in love and marry ("A Thousand and One Nights"). The Sultan later becomes attracted to Scheherazade and claims her as his wife. She gives Ja'far her scarab necklace and vows that they will be reunited one day. Back in the present, Ja'far decides to seek out the Tiger Head Cave and the wish-granting Djinn ("If I Believed").

The Princess meets Aladdin and is entranced by his free lifestyle and lack of respect for royalty, although she is oblivious to his sexual advances. He then talks about his past and how he became an orphan ("Orphaned At Thirty-Three"). Before they can kiss, they are caught by the royal guards, who throw Aladdin in prison and take the Princess home.

Ja'far bails Aladdin out of jail and has him go to the Tiger Head Cave to retrieve the Djinn's lamp. The Princess, Aladdin, and Ja'far all reflect on what they want most: a happy ending ("Happy Ending"). When Aladdin exits the Tiger Head Cave and discovers the secret of the lamp, he decides to take it for himself.

Act II
Prince Achmed returns to the kingdom of Pixar and despairs that he will only be remembered as a "throwaway joke" ("No One Remembers Achmed"). Believing that destroying the Princess' kingdom will win her affections, he and his soldiers march to war.

Back in the Magic Kingdom, Ja'far tries to warn the Princess about Aladdin. The Captain tells them that a wealthy stranger is leading a parade through the market, leaving a lot of people dead. Aladdin, disguised as a wealthy foreign prince, visits the Princess, who sees through his disguise immediately. Aladdin takes the Princess on a magic carpet ride and unsuccessfully tries to convince her to take off her clothes ("Take Off Your Clothes"). The Princess asks him to marry her, and he reluctantly agrees.

Ja'far is framed for being a sorcerer and escapes, while also stealing the lamp from Aladdin. He imagines being visited by characters from Scheherazade‘s tales, who are represented by other Disney villains. The villains claim that they are not really evil - they are portrayed as villains because their stories (with the exception of Cruella De Vil's) have become twisted ("Twisted"). Ja'far accepts that he has to take the "twisted" path. After releasing the Djinn (who only speaks in movie quotes), he uses his first wish from the lamp to make himself Sultan and the second to make himself a powerful sorcerer. Aladdin takes the Princess hostage and reveals a darker, more sinister split-personality, revealing that he himself murdered his parents when they attempted to force him out of their house to find a job. Ja'far then realizes that the Princess is his daughter, since the Sultan lost the use of his penis years ago due to inversion, and that the princess was born the same day Scheherazade died from childbirth. Aladdin agrees to release the Princess in exchange for the lamp, but before Ja'far hands it over, he uses his final wish to free the Djinn and take its place in the lamp.

Ja'far gives the lamp to the Princess, believing her youth and passion make her the only one who can use the lamp's power to its fullest potential ("The Power In Me"). The Princess wishes to bring a peaceful end to the war with Pixar, and for the kingdom to have a Sultan that will make it the happiest place on Earth once again. Finally, she wishes for Ja'far's happiness. News arrives of the Sultan's death by poison drinks and of a final declaration he had signed before dying, which named the Princess the new Sultan. Achmed's troops arrive in the throne room, and the Princess offers to buy the entirety of Pixar with Ali Baba's treasure, which was discovered during the battle. Finally, The Princess acts upon her previously mentioned desire to make everyone in the Kingdom a Princess as well and all leave the throne room happy, wondering what has become of Ja'far.

Trapped in the lamp forever, Ja'far resigns himself to his fate when he is suddenly greeted by Sherrezade, brought back to life by the Princess' last wish. She explains that the lamp exists outside of time and space, explaining the Djinn's ability to quote movies of the future, (which is portrayed to the point of farce during his appearances). Through the lamp's future vision, Ja'far sees Aladdin, shown as the old, fat antique dealer of the original movie, reframing the story to make himself the hero and Ja'far the villain until he is eventually murdered by a thief over a loaf of bread. Ja'far then asks Sherrezade how their story ends. She replies: "it doesn't!", and they kiss ("Finale / A Thousand And One Nights Reprise").

Cast and characters

Musical numbers

Act I
 "Dream a Little Harder" – Ja'far and Ensemble
 "I Steal Everything" – Aladdin and Ensemble
 "Everything and More" – Princess
 "Sands of Time" – Ja'far
 "The Golden Rule" – Ja'far and Ensemble
 "The Golden Rule (Evil Reprise)" – Vizier and Ensemble
 "A Thousand and One Nights" – Sherrezade and Ja'far
 "If I Believed" – Ja'far
 "Orphaned at Thirty-Three" – Aladdin
 "Happy Ending" – Ja'far, Aladdin, and Princess

Act II
 "No One Remembers Achmed" – Prince Achmed and Ensemble
 "Take off Your Clothes" – Aladdin and Princess
 "Twisted" – Ja'far and Ensemble
 "The Power in Me" – Princess and Ja'far
 "Finale (A Thousand and One Nights Reprise)" – Company

The official video of the original production ends with a faux-pop remix of "A Thousand and One Nights" performed by StarKid contributors Carlos Valdes and Britney Coleman.

Development
Twisted was funded entirely via a Kickstarter campaign launched by creators Matt Lang, Nick Lang, and Eric Kahn Gale. The campaign opened with a fundraising goal of $35,000 and ended up raising $142,564.

Productions
The musical was performed July 4–28, 2013, at the Greenhouse Theatre in Chicago, Illinois. The group put the entire musical up on YouTube on November 27, 2013. The recording has since received over 7.4 million views as of March 2023.

On March 17, 2014, the show was performed abridged in two sold-out concerts at 54 Below, with composer A. J. Holmes playing Ja'far and Andrea Ross playing the Princess. The production included an introduction by StarKid co-founder Darren Criss.

Recordings
A cast recording of the production was released on November 28, 2013 on digital platforms. The recording included all songs (except "A Song is a Dick in Sheep's Clothing") as well as two instrumental cues, "Sultan's Fanfare" and "The Scarab."

A karaoke album was released on November 28, 2013, exclusively on iTunes.

An EP of bonus studio recordings and demos entitled Twisted: Twisted was released on December 4, 2013. The album was produced by Andrew Fox, Michael Hart, and Stacks of Wax Productions, and featured Andrea Ross, Britney Coleman, Carlos Valdes, and Cluster. In addition to multiple demos, it also features a punk version of "Everything and More" performed by Andrea Moss, a cover of "The Golden Rule" performed by a cappella group Cluster, and Pop/R&B versions of "Take Off Your Clothes" and "A Thousand and One Nights."

Reviews
Twisted received positive reviews.

On Hypable, Danielle Zimmerman called it "smart, lively, and just outright hilarious."

On IMDb, Twisted has a rating of 8.8/10 with more than 800 voters.

See also
 Lists of musicals

References

External links
 StarKid Productions official website
 StarKid Productions on YouTube

2013 YouTube videos
2013 musicals
Aladdin (franchise)
Disney parodies
Musical parodies
Plays featuring puppetry
StarKid Productions musicals